is a survival horror and action-adventure video game series created by Shinji Mikami and developed and published by Capcom. The plot focuses on recurring outbreaks of deadly dinosaurs in closed environments, such as a laboratory on an island. The series also includes comic books and merchandise. As of December 31, 2019, the game series has sold 4.4 million units worldwide.

Games

Dino Crisis (1999)

Dino Crisis takes place on a fictional location known as Ibis Island in the year 2009. The Secret Operation Raid Team (SORT) has sent an agent, Tom, to investigate a research facility. During the recon mission, he learns that Dr. Edward Kirk, a world-renowned scientist who was reported dead three years ago, is leading a secret weapons project within the facility. SORT sends four agents (Regina, Gail, Rick, and Cooper) to acquire Kirk and return him to custody. The team arrives on the island under the cover of darkness, dropping in via parachute. Cooper is blown off course and lands in the jungle away from the others. Lost in the dark, he is chased down by a Tyrannosaurus and eaten. The other three agents, unaware of his death, proceed with the mission.

Dino Crisis 2 (2000)

After the events of the previous game, unsafe research into time-distorting Third Energy has resulted in an entire research base, military institution, and fictional metropolis of Edward City to be transported to another time; along with all of its inhabitants. Secret Operations Raid Team operative Regina returns as one of the main playable characters, sent along as an adviser to the rescue team that travels through time to find survivors of the time displacement and recover data on the Third Energy experiments. Dylan Morton, the rescue team leader, is the second playable character. Despite Dylan and Regina initially going their separate ways, they end up joining forces to find a way back to the present. The player switches between controlling Regina and Dylan at specific points during the story.

Dino Stalker (2002)

Dino Stalker a light gun shooter and the third installment in the Gun Survivor series by Capcom and contains characters from Dino Crisis 2. The Gun Survivor series is a spin-off series to the main Resident Evil series, however, Dino Stalker is the only game in the series with ties to Dino Crisis instead.

Dino Crisis: Dungeon in Chaos (2003)
Dino Crisis: Dungeon in Chaos is a first-person shooter mobile game published by the now-defunct Mobile Capcom in 2003.

Dino Crisis 3 (2003)

Set in the year 2548, it has been 300 years since Earth lost contact with the colony ship Ozymandias, en route to a². Somehow, the ship has reappeared near Jupiter. A team called S.O.A.R. (Special Operations And Reconnaissance) is sent aboard the probe ship Seyfert to investigate.

Future
For several years fans have been asking for a new installment in the Dino Crisis series. In 2014, rumors began circulating that Capcom had begun development on Dino Crisis 4. Tao Weishi (the producer of Monster Hunter Online) was interested in working with Capcom on a revival of the Dino Crisis series. Bocanegra stated: "It would certainly be nice to get a Dino Crisis revival. And Capcom could potentially start by remastering the original game, which would fall in line nicely with their current strategy when it comes to remasters". Shinji Mikami has also stated that he has long held ideas for a new game in the series.

In March 2017, Capcom's Masachika Kawata said he was not aware of any internal plans to revive the series despite it being a good prospect for remasters or remakes. In December, the official Twitter account for Capcom's lead development team responded to a fan asking if a new Dino Crisis title would release soon, to which they replied: "If a lot of people wish".

Legacy
A six-part manhua based on Dino Crisis (恐龍危機) was published in Hong Kong. It is a loose adaptation of the first Dino Crisis game, and was published by the Hong Kong-based company Jade Dynasty (玉皇朝). The series was produced by Tony Wong (黄玉郎).

Regina has also appeared in the tactical role-playing video game Namco × Capcom, beginning on a cruise ship from Gun Survivor 4 (Resident Evil: Dead Aim), and as a card in SNK vs. Capcom: Card Fighters Clash. In Resident Evil 3: Nemesis, the player can unlock her outfit with a red wig as a bonus costume for Jill Valentine. Annie also "cosplays" as Regina in Super Ultra Dead Rising 3 Arcade Remix Hyper Edition EX Plus Alpha, a downloadable content for Dead Rising 3. A figure of her was released by Yujin in the Namco × Capcom series.

See also
 Exoprimal

Notes

References

External links
 Official website 

 
Capcom franchises
Capcom games
Video game franchises
Video game franchises introduced in 1999